USS Fulmar is a name used more than once by the U.S. Navy:

 , launched 25 February 1941 by Greenport Basin and Construction Company, Long Island, Greenport, New York
 , was YMS-193 until 1 September 1947

See also
 , a United States Bureau of Fisheries research vessel in commission from 1919 to 1933–1934

United States Navy ship names